Forest of the Living Dead, also known outside of the United States as The Forest, is a 2010  American psychological horror film directed by American writer and director Shan Serafin and produced by 611 Films. It depicts the enacted vengeance of a jilted covergirl who supernaturally transforms into a demonic spirit when she kills herself in the famed suicide forest of Aokigahara, in Japan's Mount Fuji, enabling herself to wreak a violent revenge, one by one, upon those who helped her ex-boyfriend leave her.

Cast
 Aidan Bristow as Jason
 Johnny Young as Koji
 Christina Myhr as Valerie
 Michael Madsen as Lieutenant Brandon Ross
 Lisa Cullen as Katana
 Kyle Lardner as Ariaana
 Mary Takeyama as Kaneko

Production
Forest of the Living Dead was shot on-location in the United States, Japan, and Mexico. Budget estimates are under US$400,000 and box office records will be available in late 2011. The film stars Aidan Bristow, Johnny Young, Christina Myhr and veteran actor Michael Madsen. It is filmed in color, primarily on HD with some portions in film.

Release
Forest of the Living Dead debuted as The Forest in a worldwide premiere at the Bel Air Film Festival, October 15, 2010. The commercial release in the United States was slated for April 14, 2011.

See also
 The Forest (2016 film)
 Grave Halloween

References
  Entertainment 7
 Lightning Entertainment
 611 Films Production Company
 
  Douban Movie Data

External links
 
 

American psychological horror films
Films set in Aokigahara
Japan in non-Japanese culture
2010s English-language films
2010s American films